Westover was a historic plantation house located near Eastville, Northampton County, Virginia. The original house was about 1750, as a two-story, three bay, single pile structure with a gambrel roof in a vernacular style indigenous to Virginia's Eastern Shore.  A two-bay extension was added in the late-18th century, and a rear wing in the late-19th century.  The house had brick ends and a chimney with steep sloping haunches and a corbeled brick cap. It was destroyed by fire between 1980–1997.

It was listed on the National Register of Historic Places in 1982 and delisted in 2001.

References

External links
Westover, State Route 630/U.S. Route 1 vicinity (Old Town Neck), Eastville, Northampton County, VA 7 measured drawings at Historic American Buildings Survey

Former National Register of Historic Places in Virginia
Historic American Buildings Survey in Virginia
Plantation houses in Virginia
Houses completed in 1750
Houses in Northampton County, Virginia
Burned houses in the United States
1750 establishments in Virginia